The Cisalpin was an express train that linked Paris-Gare de Lyon in Paris, France, with Milano Centrale in Milan, Italy.  Introduced in 1961, it was operated by the SNCF, the Swiss Federal Railways (SBB-CFF-FFS) and the Italian State Railways (FS).

The train's name literally means this side of the Alps; It is the Roman name for the Po Valley which is seen from Rome the plain on foot of the Roman side of the Alps.

After January 1984, the Cisalpin operated as two separate trains, with timed connections in Lausanne, no longer running as a through train between France and Italy.  It was discontinued in 2003.

Route

Until 1984, the core route of the Cisalpin ran from Paris to Dijon via the Paris–Marseille railway, and then via the Dijon–Vallorbe railway as far as Vallorbe, on the Swiss side of the border between France and Switzerland.

Initially, the Cisalpin had the following stops:

 Paris-Gare de Lyon – Dijon-Ville – Lausanne – Brig – Domodossola – Milano Centrale

From January 1984, the train ran for part of its route between Paris and Dijon on the LGV Sud-Est instead of the Paris–Marseille railway.

History
From 1961 until 1984, the Cisalpin was a first-class-only Trans Europ Express (TEE). Originally operated by electric multiple unit trainsets of type RAe TEE II, the train became electric locomotive-hauled with the start of the summer 1974 schedule, on 26 May 1974.  From the same date, the route was extended from Milan to Venice (Santa Lucia station), which portion was operated only in summer. The Venice extension continued to be part of the TEE Cisalpin every summer through 1979.

In 1980, a trip on the Cisalpin from Paris to Lausanne was featured in "Changing Trains", the final episode in Series 1 of Great Railway Journeys of the World, a BBC TV travel documentary.  The "Changing Trains" trip, which was the first stage of a longer journey from Paris to Budapest, was also described in the book published to complement the series.  According to Eric Robson, the presenter and author of "Changing Trains":

In January 1984, the Cisalpin was divided into two separate trains, connecting in Lausanne, as all of the express service in the Paris–Lausanne corridor had been converted to TGV equipment.  A TGV  ran as the Cisalpin between Paris and Lausanne (in both directions), and in Lausanne had a timed connection with IC 333/336, also running as the Cisalpin but not TGV, which operated Geneva–Lausanne–Milan.

On 31 May 1987, the Cisalpin was included in the then-new EuroCity (EC) network, operating to the same pattern as before – with timed connections in Lausanne – and now designated as EC 33/36 (TGV) between Paris and Lausanne and as EC 23/26 operating Geneva–Lausanne–Milan and vice versa.

On 22 May 1993, the Geneva–Milan Cisalpin was replaced by an unnamed IC train, running Lausanne–Milano and vice versa but maintaining timed connections with the Paris trains in Lausanne.

Until 17 May 2003 the name Cisalpin was still being used for one of the TGV trains serving the Paris–Lausanne route, specifically trains EC 9268/9269.

See also

 Cisalpino, Swiss-Italian train operator
 History of rail transport in France
 History of rail transport in Italy
 History of rail transport in Switzerland
 List of named passenger trains of Europe

References

Notes

Bibliography

External links

EuroCity
International named passenger trains
Named passenger trains of France
Named passenger trains of Italy
Named passenger trains of Switzerland
Trans Europ Express
Railway services introduced in 1961
Railway services discontinued in 2003